The 1978 NASL Skelly Invitational was a four-team indoor soccer tournament held in Tulsa, Oklahoma at the Tulsa Assembly Center on the first weekend of March 1979.

Overview
Four teams, all from the North American Soccer League, participated in the two-day event; the Houston Hurricane, the Minnesota Kicks, the Washington Diplomats, and the host Tulsa Roughnecks.

Matches were 60 minutes long and divided into three 20-minute periods, with an intermission between each period. Timed overtime periods, featuring a golden goal winner, would be used to decide any matches tied after 60 minutes. Each session consisted of two games (i.e. a doubleheader).  The opening round of matches (Saturday evening's Session 1) would be semi-final games, with the Session 2 matches on Sunday afternoon severing as the third place match and Championship Final respectively. The first match of Session 1 was Minnesota's first time playing indoors. The second match of Session 1, played on Saturday, March 4, 1978 between Tulsa and Houston, marked the first time the expansion Hurricane faced NASL competition, and was only the Roughnecks third-ever game.

Approximately 3,500 people attended the two sessions. Tulsa won both of its matches and was crowned champions of the Skelly Invitational. Roughnecks' forward Nino Zec edged out both teammate Milan Dovedan and Washington's Randy Garber by one assist to lead the invitational in scoring with 5 goals and 2 assists. The tournament's co-MVPs were Zec and Tibor Molnár, also of Tulsa.  The Kicks were runners-up in the invitational, with the Dips defeating the Hurricane for 3rd place in the consolation match. The all-tournament squad included four Roughnecks: Zec, Molnar, Dovedan, and goalkeeper, Gary Allison.

Tournament results

Bracket

Sessions
Session 1: Saturday, March 4, 1978
 

Session 2: Sunday, March 5, 1978

Match reports

Session 1

Session 2

Final standings
G = Games, W = Wins, L = Losses, GF = Goals For, GA = Goals Against, GD = Goal Differential

Statistical leaders

Scoring
Goals (worth 2 points), Assists (worth 1 point)
*Three players tied with 2 goals 0 assists.

Goalkeeping
GA = Goals Against, GAA = Goals Against Average, SV = Saves, SF = Shots Faced
*Minnesota and Houston used multiple goalkeepers in each match.

Tournament awards
Most Valuable Players: Nino Zec (Tulsa) and Tibor Molnár (Tulsa)
All-tournament Team: Nino Zec (Tulsa), Milan Dovedan (Tulsa), Randy Garber (Washington), Tibor Molnar (Tulsa), Dale Russell (Houston), Gary Allison (Tulsa)

Non-tournament matches
These were not the only indoor matches played that winter. The four Skelly Invitational participants played a combined 12 additional matches. Since a full season of indoor soccer was still two years away, NASL teams were free to do their own scheduling. There were reports of the league awarding an "NASL Cup" for the best team among those that participated in at least 16 indoor games. Of the 24 teams in the league, 11 had indoor matches planned. The Tampa Bay Rowdies, for example played eight games. By contrast, the Chicago Sting signed on to play only two games at Washington, both of which were ultimately canceled because of scheduling conflicts with a boat show at the D.C. Armory. In the end, no team played more than nine games in 1978, and only a handful played more than three.

See also
North American Soccer League

References

NASL Indoor seasons
indoor
NASL Indoor Season, 1978
Tulsa Roughnecks matches
Soccer in Oklahoma
NASL Skelly